Edward Ashdown Bunyard (1878–1939) was an English food writer and apple enthusiast known for his books The Anatomy Of Dessert, A Handbook of Hardy Fruits, and The Epicure's Companion. His favourite apple was 'Orléans Reinette' which he enjoyed with port wine at Christmas. His books and descriptions of apples are still used today by heritage apple growers and people appreciative of old apple varieties.

References

1878 births
1939 deaths
English food writers